The 26th Critics' Choice Awards were presented on March 7, 2021, at the Barker Hangar at the Santa Monica Airport, honoring the finest achievements of filmmaking and television programming in 2020. The ceremony was broadcast on The CW and Taye Diggs returned to host for the third consecutive time. The television nominations were announced on January 18, 2021. The film nominations were announced on February 8, 2021. Mank led the film nominations with 12, followed by Minari with 10. The Crown and Ozark led the television nominations with six each. Overall, Netflix received a total of 72 nominations, 46 for film and 26 for television, the most for any studio or network.

Winners and nominees

Film

#SeeHer Award
 Zendaya

Television

Films with multiple nominations and wins
The following twenty-five films received multiple nominations:

The following five films received multiple awards:

Television programs with multiple nominations and wins
The following programs received multiple nominations:

The following programs received multiple awards:

See also
 1st Critics' Choice Super Awards
 3rd Critics' Choice Real TV Awards
 5th Critics' Choice Documentary Awards

References

External links
 26th Annual Critics Choice Awards – List of Film and Series Category Winners

Broadcast Film Critics Association Awards
2020 film awards
2021 in Los Angeles County, California
March 2021 events in the United States